Gabara may refer to:

 Gabara, a village in antiquity associated with Arraba, Israel
 Gabara, Palestine (also known as Gadara), an ancient city in the Roman Decapolis region of Palestine
 Gabara (moth), a genus of moths of the family Erebidae
 Gabara, a fictional Toho kaiju in All Monsters Attack
 Gabara, an Arabian giant, according to the historian Pliny the Elder